Joël Bouchard (born January 23, 1974) is a Canadian former professional ice hockey defenceman. He played in the National Hockey League with eight teams for parts of 11 seasons. He was most recently the head coach of the American Hockey League's San Diego Gulls, the minor league affiliate of the Anaheim Ducks.

Playing career
As a youth, Bouchard played in the 1988 Quebec International Pee-Wee Hockey Tournament with a minor ice hockey team from Montreal.

Bouchard was drafted by the Calgary Flames in the sixth round of the 1992 NHL Entry Draft with the 129th overall pick. He played for the Flames, Nashville Predators, Dallas Stars, Phoenix Coyotes, New Jersey Devils, New York Rangers, Pittsburgh Penguins, New York Islanders, and the AHL's Hamilton Bulldogs.

Coaching career
After his playing career ended in 2008, Bouchard worked as an analyst for Réseau des sports (RDS). He also produced and hosted his own show called "L'Académie de hockey McDonald." He became the head coach of the QMJHL's Blainville-Boisbriand Armada in 2014, leading the club to two league championship finals in 2017 and 2018.

Bouchard was hired in May 2018 as the head coach of the Laval Rocket, the AHL affiliate of the Montreal Canadiens. In 2021, he left the Rocket at the end of his contract. He posted a 83–67–24 record over three seasons.

On July 9, 2021, the Anaheim Ducks hired Bouchard to coach their AHL affiliate, the San Diego Gulls. After only one season as the head coach of the team, Bouchard was relieved from his duties.

Career statistics

Regular season and playoffs

International

Transactions
June 26, 1998 - Claimed off waivers by the Nashville Predators from the Calgary Flames.
March 14, 2000 - Claimed off waivers by the Dallas Stars from the Nashville Predators.
August 31, 2000 - Signed as a free agent with the Phoenix Coyotes.
October 25, 2001 - Signed as a free agent with the New Jersey Devils
August 5, 2002 - Signed as a free agent with the New York Rangers.
February 10, 2003 - Traded by the New York Rangers, along with Richard Lintner, Rico Fata, Mikael Samuelsson and future considerations to the Pittsburgh Penguins in exchange for Alexei Kovalev, Mike Wilson, Janne Laukkanen and Dan LaCouture.
July 14, 2003 - Signed as a free agent with the Buffalo Sabres.
October 3, 2003 - Claimed off waivers by the New York Rangers from the Buffalo Sabres.
August 18, 2005 - Signed as a free agent with the New York Islanders.
October 23, 2007 - Signed a minor league contract with Hamilton Bulldogs, AHL affiliate of Montreal Canadiens.

Coaching record

QMJHL

AHL

References

External links
 

1974 births
Living people
Albany River Rats players
Blainville-Boisbriand Armada coaches
Bridgeport Sound Tigers players
Calgary Flames draft picks
Calgary Flames players
Canadian ice hockey defencemen
Dallas Stars players
Grand Rapids Griffins (IHL) players
Hamilton Bulldogs (AHL) players
Hartford Wolf Pack players
Ice hockey people from Montreal
Longueuil Collège Français (QMJHL) players
Nashville Predators players
New Jersey Devils players
New York Rangers players
Phoenix Coyotes players
Pittsburgh Penguins players
Saint John Flames players
Verdun Collège Français players
Canadian ice hockey coaches